José Guerra may refer to:

 José Francisco Guerra (born 1968), Spanish fencer
 José Guerra (diver) (born 1979), Cuban diver
 José Guerra (footballer, born 1994), Panamanian footballer
 Jose Guerra (Canadian soccer), Canadian soccer player
 José Guerra (economist) (born 1956), Venezuelan economist, writer and politician